Otto Sauter-Sarto (29 April 1884 – 19 January 1958) was a German actor. He appeared in 70 films between 1920 and 1956.

Selected filmography

 Lumpaci the Vagabond (1922)
 Katharina Knie (1929)
 The Blue of Heaven (1932)
 At the Strasbourg (1934)
 The Voice of Love (1934)
 Love Conquers All (1934)
 You Are Adorable, Rosmarie (1934)
 The Cousin from Nowhere (1934)
 What Am I Without You (1934)
 All Because of the Dog (1935)
 The Valiant Navigator (1935)
 Make Me Happy (1935)
 If It Were Not for Music (1935)
 Artist Love (1935)
 Love Can Lie (1937)
 The Scoundrel (1939)
 A Woman Like You (1939)
 The Right to Love (1939)
 The Swedish Nightingale (1941)

References

External links

1884 births
1958 deaths
German male stage actors
German male film actors
German male silent film actors
20th-century German male actors
Male actors from Munich